The Cinder River is a stream,  long, in southwestern Lake and Peninsula Borough in the U.S. state of Alaska. It begins in Aniakchak National Monument and Preserve and flows northwest into Bristol Bay.

Silver salmon are plentiful in the Cinder River, which drains cinder beds on the flanks of Mount Aniakchak. Accessible mainly by small airplanes that can land on cinder beds or beach sand, the river is lightly fished.

See also
List of rivers of Alaska

References

Rivers of Lake and Peninsula Borough, Alaska
Rivers of Alaska